Koursaroi ("privateers or privateering vessels"), also known as Nisaki ("small island"), is an islet close to the western coast of Crete, and north-east of the islet of Praso, in the Aegean Sea. Administratively, it is located within the municipality of Kissamos, in Chania regional unit.

See also
List of islands of Greece

Landforms of Chania (regional unit)
Uninhabited islands of Crete
Mediterranean islands
Islands of Greece